Al Marakeb Pro Cycling Team was a UCI Continental cycling team based in Umm Al Quwain, United Arab Emirates, founded in 2015. They competed on the UCI Asia Tour and UCI Africa Tour.

Team Roster

Major wins

2015
Challenge des phosphates-Grand prix de Khouribga, Mouhssine Lahsaini
Overall Tour du Faso, Mouhssine Lahsaini
Overall  Grand Prix Chantal Biya, Mouhssine Lahsaini
Overall  Tour de Côte d'Ivoire, Mouhssine Lahsaini
Stage 2 (ITT), Mouhssine Lahsaini
Les Challenges de la Marche Verte, Abdelati Saadoune
2016
Criterium International d'Alger, Nassim Saidi

References

Cycling teams established in 2015
UCI Continental Teams (Africa)
Cycling teams based in Morocco
2015 establishments in Morocco